Paschall–Daniel House is a historic tobacco plantation complex and national historic district located at Oxford, Granville County, North Carolina, USA. It was built about 1855, and is a two-story, three bay, "T"-shaped Greek Revival style timber frame dwelling. It has a low hipped roof and two-story rear ell.  Also on the property are the contributing milking house, garage, frame barn, milking barn, wood house, chicken house, and a log tobacco barn.

It was listed on the National Register of Historic Places in 1988.

References

Tobacco plantations in the United States
Plantation houses in North Carolina
Farms on the National Register of Historic Places in North Carolina
Historic districts on the National Register of Historic Places in North Carolina
Greek Revival houses in North Carolina
Houses completed in 1855
Houses in Granville County, North Carolina
National Register of Historic Places in Granville County, North Carolina